Public factory estates are blocks of factory buildings owned by the Government of Hong Kong. Built between the late 1950s and the early 1980s, most of these industrial buildings have been demolished during the 1990s and 2000s, while some have been converted and a few are still active. While these buildings are notable as witnesses of the history of manufacturing in Hong Kong and of the public housing policy of the Government of Hong Kong, they represent only a fraction of the industrial buildings of the territory: there were about 1,700 industrial buildings in Hong Kong in 2003.

History
The Resettlement Department of the Government of Hong Kong was formed in 1954. Between 1957 and 1973, it built eight flatted factory estates as part of the resettlement programme to reprovision squatter factories and cottage workshops displaced by clearance operations. The management of these factory estates was transferred to the Hong Kong Housing Authority upon its establishment in 1973. The Housing Authority further built several factory estates in the late 1970s and the early 1980s in order to address a shortage of small factory units in private factory buildings. A total of 17 public factory estates were thus built. In order to focus on its core mission of providing subsidised rental housing to low-income families in need, the Housing Authority decided in 1989 to progressively absolve itself from the ownership and management of flatted factories in the long term.

In May 2021, the Hong Kong Housing Authority was still managing 6 factory estates: Hoi Tai Factory Estate in Tuen Mun, Kwai On and Chun Shing Factory Estates in Kwai Chung, Sui Fai Factory Estate in Fo Tan, Wang Cheong Factory Estate in Cheung Sha Wan and Yip On Factory Estate in Kowloon Bay. On May 24, 2021, it announced plans to redevelop 4 of them for public housing use: Kwai On Factory Estate, Sui Fai Factory Estate, Wang Cheong Factory Estate and Yip On Factory Estate.

Features
By the end of 2004, 11 public factory estates were still active and owned by the Housing Authority. These 11 estates provided about 13,300 factory units with a total floor area of about 325,300 m2. Five of the estates were built with no lift service. Of these 11 estates, five were managed by property management agents, with the other six managed by Housing Department staff.

Conservation
Two out of the ten pre-1980 former public factory estates are still extant. The Chai Wan Factory Estate was listed as a Grade II historic building in 2013 and was planned for adaptive reuse. The estate was renovated and reopened in 2016 as the residential Wah Ha Estate, The Shek Kip Mei Factory Estate was converted into the Jockey Club Creative Arts Centre, which opened in 2008. These conversions are linked to the Heritage conservation and the Old Industrial Buildings Revitalization programmes of the government.

Former estates
The former factory estates were:

Active estates
The following factory estates, owned by the Hong Kong Housing Authority, are still active as of January 2014:

References

Factory buildings in Hong Kong